William Painter or Paynter may refer to

William Painter (author) (1540?–1594), English author and translator
William Painter (inventor) (1838–1906), inventor of the crown cork and the founder of Crown Holdings, Inc.
William Paynter (academic) (1637–1716), English clergyman and Vice-Chancellor of Oxford University
Will Paynter (1903–1984), Welsh miners' leader
William Henry Paynter (1901–1976), Cornish antiquary and folklorist
William Hunt Painter (1835–1910), English botanist
William Rock Painter (1863–1947), Democratic politician from the state of Missouri